The Sankt-Ansgar-Schule (common abbreviation: SAS) is a private secondary school in Hamburg, Germany. It was founded in 1946 as the only boys' school by the Society of Jesus, an order of the Catholic Church, in the State of Hamburg. The school was named after Saint Ansgar who christianized Northern Germany in the 9th century. The motto of the SAS is:  which is engraved above the official main entrance. In 1978, it became a co-educational school. The Jesuits gave up running the school in 1993 themselves but the Sankt-Ansgar-Schule has remained a member of the association of Jesuit schools and still follows all of the order's rules for their educational institutions. Currently, the archbishopric of Hamburg formerly runs the school.

History 
In 1917, the first plans were made to found a Jesuit school in Hamburg. For many reasons like World War I, the following hyperinflation in the Weimar Republic, and the period of Nazi Germany, they could not be implemented. Right after World War II, the Catholic church started to negotiate with the British occupation authorities as well as the Senate as the city civil government again. The plans for a new secondary school were approved and the SAS was founded on 4 May 1946. Today, the Sankt-Ansgar-Schule is regarded as an example for a typical German Gymnasium by the National Library of Germany.

Education 

The Leitmotif at the SAS is based on the educational concepts according to Ignatius of Loyola (1491-1556), founder of the Society of Jesus. His Ratio Studiorum of 1598 sets the theoretical basis of Ignatian pedagogy up to modern times. The publication emphasizes three pillars: altruism, justice, and self-reflection on one's own deeds.

The SAS follows all rules and regulations made by the state for all public schools in Hamburg. Therefore, despite the fact that, for example, Catholic religion is an obligatory subject, evolution is taught in biology and not creationism.

Location and Buildings 
The school lies in the Hamburg district of Borgfelde, near the city center and the Alster lake. The premises of the SAS at the Bürgerweide street used to be home for an elementary school which was destroyed during the Operation Gomorrah, a massive bombing in 1943 by the RAF Bomber Command.

Since 1968, it is listed in the official register of the cultural heritage management of the state of Hamburg. In 1970–1971, an extension building alongside the adjacent  was built and opened. In 2010, it was expanded with six new classrooms and an elevator.

The facility is close to a Penny market which is popular among students. Mostly during the big break and lunchtime but also if a class is cancelled, students walk to the store and grab something to drink or to eat.

Notable alumni 
 Ansgar Beckermann
 Brun-Otto Bryde
 Milka Loff Fernandes
 Godehard Giese
 Klaus Grawe
 Iveta Mukuchyan
 Alexander-Martin Sardina
 Christoph de Vries
 Michael Weikath

See also 
 Aloisiuskolleg, Bonn
 Canisius-Kolleg Berlin
 Kolleg St. Blasien
 List of Jesuit sites

References

Publications by the school 

 Sankt-Ansgar-Schule (Ed.): Bericht Sankt-Ansgar-Schule. Hamburg, 1955.
 Sankt-Ansgar-Schule, Pater Hans Hartmann SJ: Sankt-Ansgar-Schule Hamburg. 1960–1964. Hamburg, 1964.
 Sankt-Ansgar-Schule (Ed.): Sankt-Ansgar-Schule Hamburg. 1946–1971. Hamburg, 1971.
 Sankt-Ansgar-Schule, Christoph Disselhoff (Ed.): 40 Jahre Sankt-Ansgar-Schule. 1946–1986. Hamburg, 1986.
 Sankt-Ansgar-Schule, Andreas Oettel, Helge Sturm (Ed.): 50 Jahre Sankt-Ansgar-Schule. 1946–1996. Publication with a CD-ROM (19 pieces of the SAS Band). Hamburg, 1996.
 Sankt-Ansgar-Schule (Ed.): So beten wir! Gebete von Jugendlichen der 10. Klassen der Sankt-Ansgar-Schule in Hamburg. Hamburg, 1999.
 Sankt-Ansgar-Schule, Richard Lutz (Ed.): Borgfelde – Damals und heute. 1880–2012. Bildband zum Schülerprojekt zum 70. Jahrestag der Zerstörung des Stadtteils und der Einweihung des Schulgebäudes vor 60 Jahren. Hamburg, 2013.

External links 
 
 Official Website of the Sankt-Ansgar-Schule
 Jesuit Alumni Worldwide

Educational institutions established in 1946
Schools in Hamburg
 
Private schools in Germany
Jesuit history in Germany
Jesuit secondary schools in Germany
Gymnasiums in Germany
1946 establishments in Germany